Hajji Tappeh (also Romanized as Ḩājjī Tappeh; also known as Ḩājjī Tappehābād) is a village in Basharyat-e Sharqi Rural District, Basharyat District, Abyek County, Qazvin Province, Iran. At the 2006 census, its population was 1,005, in 253 families.

References 

Populated places in Abyek County